Judicial police in France are responsible for the investigation  of criminal offenses and identification of perpetrators. This is in contrast to Administrative police in France, whose goal is to ensure the maintenance of public order and to prevent crime. Article 14 of the  provides the legal basis for the authority of the Judicial police.

The separation of administrative and judicial policing functions dates to the 1795 Code of Offences and Penalties, and is still in force today. It is a functional distinction, which does not necessarily imply an organizational separation: a single organization may be charged with carrying out both types of police functions: one example is the National Gendarmerie.

History

Origins 

The judicial police was formed by Georges Clémenceau, who was Minister of the Interior, in order to create a "police force responsible for assisting the judicial authority in the repression of crimes and misdemeanors".

During the Belle Époque, under the Third Republic, the French government was under increasing political pressure to do something about the rising level of insecurity, due to the rise of organized, marauding bands of brigands operating in various regions almost with impunity in the face of dispersed and poorly trained municipal police, and insufficient numbers of national police. This came to a head in the first decade of the 20th century, when organized criminal gangs pillaged, murdered, and tortured victims in several departments of France.

In response, Clemenceau issued a decree dated 4 March 1907 which created a structure under the command of Commissioner , who was the first head of the French judicial police. This was followed by another decree in December which established twelve regional brigades around the country, dedicated to fighting organized crime.

Early success 

By 1909, there were some early successes, with 2700 arrests, including for 65 murders, and various rapists, fraudsters, counterfeiters, and burglars rounded up. By 1910, their tools included automobiles. Clemenceau wanted them to become a kind of rapid deployment force, in order to combat the increasing sophistication of gangs who took advantage of improvement in communications for better means of escape, which the scattered and disconnected municipal police authorities were unable to keep up with. There was some reorganization of regional brigades, and expansion to 15 regional centers in 1911.

Interwar period 

During the First World War, there was a focus on counterespionage, including the Mata Hari affair. After the war was over, there was some additional restructuring, ending up in 1924 with 16 brigades, 85 commissioners, and 290 inspectors. In order to better cooperate with other countries in Europe in combatting crime in France, new regulations were instituted in 1928 naming the judicial police as the agency representing France in Interpol. In 1929, the first central office of the judicial police was created, in order to fight against counterfeiting (O.C.R.F.M.). This period also marked the involvement of the mobile brigade in the resolution of sensational cases such as the swindler  in 1929, the Stavisky affair in 1933, or of the serial killer Eugen Weidmann in 1937.

World War II 

In 1941, reforms in the management of the national police under the Vichy regime reshuffled the Judicial police (at that time, the ) and merged the regional mobile brigades with the security forces, which took on the name "Regional Judicial Police Services" (SRPJ). These reforms were undone in 1946 after the Liberation, when the judicial police became part of the  Sécurité Publique, and the SRPJ became regional mobile police brigades. That lasted only a year, and in 1947 the regional judicial police services were reestablished with 17 offices around the country.

Post-war period 

A number of violent crime gangs formed in the post-war period, forcing the Judicial police to adapt, with the creation of anti-gang task forces called GRBs in 1949.

The Law of 9 July 1966 pushed by de Gaulle established a national police force in France, and created the Central Directorate of the Judicial Police (D.C.P.J.) to oversee the 18 regional offices, and in 1969 the network was extended by the creation of branches and detachments which operated under the regional offices.

See also 

 Codification (law)
 Cour d'appel
 Court of Appeal (France)
 Court of Cassation
 Criminal justice system of France
 Declaration of the Rights of Man and of the Citizen
 French penal code
 Law of France
 Napoleonic Code – civil, not criminal
 Nulla poena sine lege
 Principle of legality in French criminal law

References

Works cited

Further reading

External links 
 France: Penal Code of 1810
 History of the Judicial Police

French criminal law
Law enforcement in France